Hanworth is a suburb of London, England.

Hanworth can also refer to:

Hanworth, Bracknell, Berkshire, England
Hanworth, East Brisbane, Queensland, Australia
Hanworth, Norfolk, England
Cold Hanworth, Lincolnshire, England
Potterhanworth, Lincolnshire, England
Viscount Hanworth, a title in the Peerage of the United Kingdom